This is a List of Rajasthan first-class cricket records, with each list containing the top five performances in the category.

Currently active players are in bold.

Team records

Highest innings totals

Lowest innings totals

Batting records

Highest individual scores

Bowling records

Best innings bowling

Hat-Trick

Notes

All lists are referenced to CricketArchive.

See also

 Rajasthan cricket team
 List of Rajasthan List A cricket records

First-class records
Indian cricket lists